This is a list of Malaysians, people who are identified with Malaysia through residential, legal, historical or cultural means, grouped by their area of notability.

By ethnicity or place of origin
 Malaysians of Malay descent
 Malaysians of Chinese descent
 Malaysians of Indian descent

By Malaysian state
 Johor
 Kedah
 Kelantan
 Kuala Lumpur
 Malacca
 Negeri Sembilan
 Pahang
 Penang
 Perak
 Perlis
 Sabah
 Sarawak
 Selangor
 Terengganu
 Foreign-born Malaysians

Academicians
Wang Gungwu
Lakssmitha Kumararaja
Khoo Kay Kim
Wu Teh Yao 
Afifi al-Akiti
Khasnor Johan, historian
Chin Liew Ten
Jomo Kwame Sundaram
Danny Quah
Ungku Abdul Aziz
Lee Poh Ping

Architects

Artists

Businesspeople
Tan Hiok Nee (1827–1902)
Chung Keng Quee (1827–1901)
Foo Choo Choon (1860–1921)
Tan Chay Yan (1870–1916)
Cheah Cheang Lim (1875–1948)
Loh Boon Siew (1915–1995)
Lim Goh Tong (1918–2007)
Choong Chin Liang (1920–1998)
Robert Kuok (born 1923)
Lakssmitha Kumararaja (born 2007)
Teh Hong Piow (1930–2022)
Ananda Krishnan (born 1938)
Azman Hashim (born 1938)
Quek Leng Chan (born 1941)
Jeffrey Cheah Fook Ling
Vincent Tan Chee Yioun (born 1952)
Syed Mokhtar Al-Bukhary (born 1956)
Lim Kok Thay (born 1951)
Tony Fernandes (born 1964)
William Cheng
Shoba Purushothaman
Shah Hakim Zain
Halim Saad
Saleh Sulong
Lillian Too (born 1946)
Yeoh Tiong Lay (1929–2017)
Francis Yeoh
Daim Zainuddin (born 1938)
Kong Hon Kong
Armin Baniaz Pahamin
Ramly bin Mokni

Designers
 Zang Toi (born 1961), fashion designer, won the Mouton-Cadet Young Designers Award in 1991, was awarded the title of Datuk by the King of Malaysia in 2013
 Jimmy Choo (born 1961), shoe designer, best known for co-founding Jimmy Choo Ltd, which became known for its handmade women's shoes
 Melinda Looi, fashion designer
 Bernard Chandran, fashion designer

Inventors
 Yi Ren Ng, inventor of the Lytro

Entertainers

Michelle Yeoh, Hollywood actress (born 1962)
Ah Niu (born 1976), Malaysian Chinese singer 
Angelica Lee (born 1976), Malaysian Chinese film actress and pop singer
Imee Ooi
Shila Amzah (born 1990), Malaysian singer-songwriter 
Gary Chaw (born 1979), Malaysian singer-songwriter
Joyce Chu (born 1997), Malaysian singer-songwriter
Yasmin Ahmad (1958–2009), film director
Stacy Angie (born 1990)
Francissca Peter (born 1961)
Jamal Abdillah (born 1959)
Sudirman Arshad (1954–1992)
Loganathan Arumugam (1953–2007)
David Arumugam, founding member of the Alleycats
Awal Ashaari (born 1981)
Alvin Anthons (born 1976)
Asmawi bin Ani (born 1981)
Ahmad Azhar (born 1968)
Ning Baizura (born 1975)
Kasma Booty (died 2007)
Ella (born 1966)
Erra Fazira (born 1974)
Sean Ghazi (born 1969)
Fauziah Latiff (born 1970)
Daniel Lee Chee Hun (born 1983)
Sheila Majid (born 1965)
Amy Mastura (born 1971)
Meor Aziddin Yusof (born 1967)
Dayang Nurfaizah (born 1981)
Shanon Shah (born 1978)
Mohd Taufik Nordin (born 1979)
Siti Nurhaliza (born 1979)
Misha Omar (born 1982)
Hani Mohsin (1965–2006)
Aziz M. Osman (born 1962)
Azmyl Yunor (born 1977)
P. Ramlee (1929–1973)
Aziz Sattar (1925–2014)
Fasha Sandha (born 1984)
Aznil Nawawi (born 1962)
Din Beramboi (1966–2010)
Nicholas Teo (born 1981)
Pete Teo (born 1972) 
Penny Tai (born 1978)
Hannah Tan (born 1981)
Ho Yuhang (born 1971)
Jaclyn Victor (born 1978)
Scha Alyahya (born 1983)
Shock System
Fazura (born 1983)
Lisa Surihani (born 1986)
Chef Wan (born 1958)
Adira Suhaimi (born 1991)
Michael Wong (born 1970)
Victor Wong (born 1972)
Ziana Zain (born 1968)
Zee Avi (born 1985)
Yuna (born 1986)
Zamil Idris (born 1978)
Neelofa (born 1989)
Namewee (born 1983)
Fish Leong (born 1978)
Nelissa Nizam (born 1998)
Dhia Azrai (born 2005)
Ben Ladin (born 2001)
Idan Aedan (born 2004)
Peanut (born 2004)
Aniq Iffat (born 2006)
Iqram Dinzly (born 1981)
Aedy Ashraf (born 1993)
Adam Lee (born 1994)
Emma Maembong (born 1992)
Syafie Naswip (born 1992) 
Sharifah Aryana (born 1995)
Juzzthin (born 1990)
Hairul Azreen (born 1988)
Amar Asyraf (born 1986)
Kamal Adli (born 1986)
Nadhir Nasar (born 1996)
Putri Hanan (born 1996)
Fadlan Hazim (born 1992)
Akim Rahman (born 1993)
Alif Satar (born 1990)
Faliq Auri (born 1989)
Hafidz Roshdi (born 1994)
Shukri Yahaya (born 1988) 
Johan As'ari (born 1986)
Beto Kusyairy (born 1980)
Tomok (born 1984)
Efry Arwis (born 1986)
Syafiq Yusof (born 1992) 
Syamsul Yusof (born 1984)
Syazwan Zulkifly (born 1987)
Zhang Yaodong (born 1977)
Chen Hanwei (born 1969)
Shaun Chen (born 1978)
Christopher Lee (born 1971)
Lawrence Wong (born 1988)
Zen Chong (born 1978)
Ronny Chieng (born 1985) 
Janna Nick (born 1995)
Faizal Tahir (born 1978)
Nina Nadira (born 1992) 
Izzue Islam (born 1990)
Aznie Azmi (born 2000)
Ayunie Rizal (born 1998)
Faa Zaini (born 1997)
Ezzrin Loy (born 1997)
Kucaimars (born 1997)
Naim Daniel (born 1997)
Aryan Naim (born 1997)
Wanna Ali (born 1997)
Sweet Qismina (born 1997)
Siti Khadijah Halim (born 1997)
Ayie Elham (born 1997)
Firdaus Sora (born 1997)
Hun Haqeem (born 1998)
Ariff Bahran (born 1998)
Yonnyboii (born 1998)
Zynakal (born 1998)
Puteri Khareeza (born 1998)
Sharifah Rose (born 1998)
Mierul Aiman (born 1998)
Farhan Nordin (born 1998)
Zaid Erakad (born 1998)
Haqiem Rusli (born 1998)
Noel (born 1998)
Izzu (born 1998)
Aqil Taqee (born 1999)
Scha Elinnea (born 1999)
Zaim Yazid (born 1999)
Ezly Syazwan (born 1999)
Amir Ahnaf (born 2000)
Alif Haiqal (born 2000)
Ideen Azman (born 2000)
Fazziq Muqris (born 2000)
Aniq Suhair (born 2000)
Afiq Hamidon (born 2001)
Syerinie Myra (born 2001)
Meerqeen (born 2001)
Preti Kaur Gill (born 2001)
Syahmi Irfan (born 2001)
Syazani Zainal (born 2002)
Zali Rusli (born 2005)
Zalif Sidek (born 1985)
Shuk Sahar (born 1986)
Nik Adam Mika (born 2010)
Lokman Hakimshah (born 2009)
Nur Qistina Raisah (born 2008)
Puteri Balqis Azizi (born 2007)
Aliff Idham (born 2006)
Armand Ezra (born 2006)
Zaki Yamani (born 2006)
Fariz Isqandar (born 2005)
Amir Idlan (born 2005)
Khir Shah (born 2005)
Amirul Farhan (born 2005)
Hazriq Danish (born 2005)
Zairin Nazmi (born 2005)
Danish Fitri (born 2005)
Redzwan Adha (born 2004)
Aqeesh Aleeya (born 2004)
Syafa Wany (born 2004)
Syamim Razi (born 2003)
Izz Ilham (born 2003)
Bella Dowanna Halim (born 2003)
Muntazar Ghufran (born 2003)
Shairi (born 2003)
Firdaus Ghufran (born 2002)
Danial Chuer (born 2001)
As'ad Motawh (born 2001)
Ismail Izzani (born 2000)
Imran Aqil (born 1999)
Nabil Aqil (born 1998)
Nabil Ahmad (born 1983)
Zizan Razak (born 1984)
Hazman Al-Idrus (born 1988)
Erry Putra (born 1978)
Aweera (born 1991)
Andi Bernadee (born 1991)
Fad Bocey (born 1991)
Ain Edruce (born 1991)
Alvin Chong (born 1991)
Sufian Suhaimi (born 1992)
Wany Hasrita (born 1992)
Hael Husaini (born 1987)
Black Hanifah (born 1987)
Hazama Azmi (born 1984)
Syafeek Ikhwan (born 1988)
Yuna Rahim (born 1995)
Zarina Zainuddin (born 1970)
Aleza Shadan (born 1975)
Azhan Rani (born 1976)
Jaa Suzuran (born 1994)
Zaki Azeman (born 1994)
Syamim Farid (born 1991)
Akim Ahmad (born 1991)
Hafreez Adam (born 1990)
Ramona Zamzam (born 1990)
Hafiz Suip (born 1990)
Saharul Ridzwan (born 1989)
Anas Ridzuan (born 1989)
Aiman Hakim Ridza (born 1989)
Aizat Amdan (born 1989)
Jasmine Suraya Chin (born 1989)
Fendy Bakry (born 1988)
Naqiu Boboy (born 1986)
Zoey Rahman (born 1985)
Noh Salleh (born 1985)
Zarina Zainoordin (born 1984)
Remy Ishak (born 1982)
Edry Abdul Halim (born 1976)
Yusry Abdul Halim (born 1973)
Norman Abdul Halim (born 1972)

Military
Tan Kee Soon (1803–1857), warrior and leader of Ngee Heng Kongsi, ordered the 4,000 members of its brotherhood to relocate in Johor 
Albert Kwok Fen Nam (1921–1944), warrior and leader of the "Kinabalu Guerrillas" against Japanese occupation
Leftenan Adnan (1915–1942), warrior from Malaya, who fought the Japanese at the Battle of Pasir Panjang in Singapore
Antanum, warrior from Sabah, Borneo
Rentap, warrior from Sarawak
Syarif Masahor, warrior from Sarawak
Monsopiad, warrior from Sabah, Borneo
Haji Abdul Rahman Limbong, warrior from Telemong, Terengganu
Mat Salleh, warrior from Sabah, Borneo
Rosli Dhobi, warrior from Sarawak

Sciences
Lim Boon Keng (1868–1957), first Malayan to receive a Queen's Scholarship, gained admission to the University of Edinburgh and graduated in 1892 with a first class honours degree in medicine
Wu Lien-teh (1879–1960), a Malaysian physician renowned for his work in public health, and the first Malayan nominated for the Nobel Prize in Physiology or Medicine in 1935
Cheah Ming Tatt (born 1983), biologist specializing in immunology and genetics, a recipient of Howard Hughes Medical Institute's Future Scientists Fellowship for his work on RNA splicing
Shu Jie Lam, research chemist at University of Melbourne
Siti Aisyah Alias (born 1966), marine polar researcher and educator
Dr. I-Min Lee (born 1960) Epidemiologist, Harvard School of Public Health, leading researcher into the role of physical activity in promoting health and preventing chronic disease

Politicians
Parameswara, founder of Sultanate of Malacca
Tunku Abdul Rahman Putra Al-Haj, first Prime Minister of Malaya and Malaysia
 Tun Leong Yew Koh, first Malacca Governor, only Chinese ever appointed as the Yang di-Pertua Negeri in Malaysia, co-founder and first Secretary-General of MCA
Colonel Tun Sir Henry Lee Hau Shik, first Finance Minister of the Federation of Malaya and co-founded the Malaysian Chinese Association and Alliance Party
Tun Dato Sir Tan Cheng Lock, founder and the first president of the Malayan Chinese Association (MCA)
Tun V. T. Sambanthan, founding fathers of Malaysia along with Tunku Abdul Rahman and Tan Cheng Lock
Tun Abdul Razak, second Prime Minister
Tun Hussein Onn, third Prime Minister
Tun Dr Mahathir Mohamad, fourth and seventh Prime Minister, father of Modernisation
Tun Haji Abdullah Ahmad Badawi, fifth Prime Minister
Najib Tun Razak, sixth Prime Minister
Muhyiddin Yassin, eighth prime minister
Tun Tan Siew Sin, first Minister of Commerce and Industry, Finance Minister for 15 years
Tun Dato' Seri Lim Chong Eu, Chief Minister of Penang from 1969 to 1990, was termed as the "Architect of Modern Penang"
Tun Dr. Lim Keng Yaik, one of the longest-serving ministers in the country and a highly revered statesman by the public
Tan Sri Dato' Lee San Choon, held various ministerial posts in the cabinet from 1969 to 1983, such as Labour and Manpower Minister, Works and Public Utilities Minister, as well as Transport Minister
Tan Sri Dato' Seri Ong Ka Ting, former Housing and Local Government Minister from 1999 to 2008 and Acting Transport Minister from May to June 2003
Tan Sri Dr. Koh Tsu Koon, Chief Minister of Penang from 1990 to 2008
Anwar Ibrahim
Wan Hisham
Nik Aziz Nik Mat
Raja Nong Chik Zainal Abidin, Federal Territory and Urban Well-being Minister 2010
Wan Azizah Wan Ismail, 12th Deputy Prime Minister
Karpal Singh
Lim Kit Siang
Lim Guan Eng
Tengku Razaleigh Hamzah

Religious
Ven. Dr. Kirinde Sri Dhammananda Nāyaka Thero, Buddhist monk and scholar, often regarded as Chief High Priest of Malaysia and Singapore
Ven. Datuk K. Sri Dhammaratana, Buddhist monk and instrumental in setting up Ti-Ratana Welfare Society
Ven. K. L. Dhammajoti, Buddhist monk, one of the leading scholars on 'Sarvastivada Abhidharma' and is well known in the world of Buddhist scholarship
Ven. Sujiva, well-known teacher of Vipassana in the Theravāda Buddhist Tradition
Ven. Chi Chern, well-known Buddhist monk and principal of the Malaysian Buddhist Institute.
Antony Selvanayagam, Roman Catholic Bishop of the Diocese of Penang
Anthony Soter Fernandez, Archbishop Emeritus of the Roman Catholic Archdiocese of Kuala Lumpur, and Bishop Emeritus of the Diocese of Penang
Gregory Yong (1925–2008), Second Roman Catholic Archbishop of Singapore
Murphy Nicholas Xavier Pakiam, Metropolitan archbishop of the Roman Catholic Archdiocese of Kuala Lumpur, president of the Catholic Bishops' Conference of Malaysia, Singapore and Brunei; and publisher of the Catholic weekly newspaper, The Herald
Ng Moon Hing, fourth and current Anglican Bishop of West Malaysia

Sportspeople

Squash
Nicol Ann David
Ong Beng Hee
Azlan Iskandar
Low Wee Wern
Chan Yiwen
Aifa Azman
Rachel Arnold
Wen Li Lai
Yee Xin Ying
Mohd Syafiq Kamal
Ivan Yuen
Ng Eain Yow
Addeen Idrakie
Ong Sai Hung
Darren Rahul Pragasam
Mohd Nafiizwan Adnan

Badminton
Lee Zii Jia, men's singles
Ng Tze Yong, men's singles
Tan Jia Jie, men's singles
Tan Ming Kang, men's singles
Cheam June Wei, men's singles
Yeoh Seng Zoe, men's singles
Lim Chi Wing, men's singles
Soong Joo Ven, men's singles
Lim Chong King, men's singles
Aidil Sholeh, men's singles
Lee Shun Yang, men's singles
Justin Hoh, men's singles
Kok Jing Hong, men's singles
Yap Khai Quan, men's singles
Ong Ken Yon, men's singles
Eogene Ewe Eon, men's singles
Tai Chuan Zhe, men's singles
Faiz Rozain, men's singles
Ng Jun Yan, men's singles
Ong Zhen Yi, men's singles
Fazriq Razif, men's singles
Goh Jin Wei, women's singles
Wong Ling Ching, women's singles
Myisha Mohd Khairul, women's singles
Siti Nurshuhaini, women's singles
Loh Zhi Wei, women's singles
Khor Jing Wen, women's singles
Eoon Qi Xuan, women's singles
Joanne Ng, women's singles
Lim Jing Ning, women's singles
Saranya Navaratnarajah, women's singles
Aaron Chia, men's doubles
Soh Wooi Yik, men's doubles
Man Wei Chong, men's doubles
Tee Kai Wun, men's doubles
Lim Khim Wah, men's doubles
Nur Izzuddin, men's doubles
Junaidi Arif, men's doubles
Muhammad Haikal, men's doubles
Tan Kian Meng, men's doubles
Tan Wee Kiong, men's doubles
Tan Yi Han, men's doubles
Tan Kok Xian, men's doubles
Goh Sze Fei, men's doubles
Goh Boon Zhe, men's doubles
Goh V Shem, men's doubles
Goh Shao Tang, men's doubles
Boon Xin Yuan, men's doubles
Wong Tien Ci, men's doubles
Ong Yew Sin, men's doubles
Teo Ee Yi, men's doubles
Zulhairi Sahimin, men's doubles
Fawwaz Zainuddin, men's doubles
Faris Amrin, men's doubles
Kok Jia Cheng, men's doubles
Liew Xun, men's doubles
Loo Bing Kun, men's doubles
Lwi Sheng Hao, men's doubles
Muhammad Syazmil Idham Zainal Abidin, men's doubles
Ameer Amri Zainuddin, men's doubles
Faris Zaim, men's doubles
Muhammad Nurfirdaus Azman, men's doubles
Yap Roy King, men's doubles
Wong Vin Sean, men's doubles
Low Hang Yee, men's doubles
Ng Eng Cheong, men's doubles
Go Pei Kee, women's doubles
Teoh Mei Xing, women's doubles
Pearly Tan, women's doubles
Thinaah Muralitharan, women's doubles
Vivian Hoo, women's doubles
Lim Chiew Sien, women's doubles
Desiree Siow, women's doubles
Ng Qi Xuan, women's doubles
Yap Rui Chen, women's doubles
Teoh Le Xuan, women's doubles
Low Yeen Yuan, women's doubles
Valeree Siow, women's doubles
Ong Xin Yee, women's doubles
Carmen Ting, women's doubles
Chan Peng Soon, mixed doubles
Cheah Yee See, mixed doubles
Goh Soon Huat, mixed doubles
Shevon Lai, mixed doubles
Hoo Pang Ron, mixed doubles
Lai Pei Jing, mixed doubles
Gan Jing Err, mixed doubles
Bryan Jeremy Goonting, mixed doubles
Lee Xin Jie, mixed doubles
Choi Jian Sheng, mixed doubles
Lai Ting Cen, mixed doubles

Retired
Chong Wei Feng
Chin Eei Hui
Chew Choon Eng
Chan Chong Ming
Muhammad Hafiz Hashim
Koo Kien Keat
Roslin Hashim
Wong Choong Hann
Lee Chong Wei
Tan Aik Huang
Eddy Choong
Punch Gunalan
Yap Kim Hock
Foo Kok Keong
Jalani Sidek
Misbun Sidek
Rashid Sidek
Razif Sidek
Cheah Soon Kit
Lee Wan Wah
Goh Liu Ying
Wong Pei Tty
Choong Tan Fook
Tan Boon Heong
Mohd Zakry Abdul Latif
Mohd Fairuzizuan Mohd Tazari
Hoon Thien How
Iskandar Zulkarnain Zainuddin

Football (soccer)

Samransak Kram, Perlis FA and former Malaysian player
Manopsak Kram, Pos Malaysia FC
Brendan Gan, Sydney FC, Sabah FA, Kelantan FA
Hattaphon Bun An, M3 League club, Langkawi Glory United.
Matthew Davies, Perth Glory FC, Pahang FC
Shaun Maloney, Wigan Athletic
Akmal Rizal, Perak FA, Kedah FA, RC Strasbourg, FCSR Haguenau
Norshahrul Idlan Talaha, Kelantan FA, Johor Darul Ta'zim F.C.
Khairul Fahmi Che Mat, Kelantan FA
Mohd Safiq Rahim, Selangor FA, Johor Darul Ta'zim F.C.
Mohd Fadzli Saari, Selangor FA, PBDKT T-Team FC, SV Wehen
Rudie Ramli, Selangor FA, PKNS F.C., SV Wehen
Mohd Safee Mohd Sali, Sarawak FA, Selangor FA, Pelita Jaya, Johor Darul Ta'zim F.C.
Chun Keng Hong, Penang FA, Chanthaburi F.C.
Baddrol Bakhtiar, Kedah FA
Mohd Khyril Muhymeen Zambri, Kedah FA
Mohd Azmi Muslim, Kedah FA
Mohd Fadhli Mohd Shas, Harimau Muda A, FC ViOn Zlaté Moravce, Johor Darul Ta'zim F.C.
Mohd Irfan Fazail, Harimau Muda A, FC ViOn Zlaté Moravce, Johor Darul Ta'zim F.C.
Wan Zack Haikal Wan Noor, Harimau Muda A, FC ViOn Zlaté Moravce, F.C. Ryūkyū, Kelantan FA
Nazirul Naim Che Hashim, Harimau Muda A, F.C. Ryūkyū, Perak FA
Khairul Izuan Rosli, Sarawak FA, Persibo Bojonegoro, PDRM FA
Stanley Bernard Stephen Samuel, Sabah FA, Sporting Clube de Goa
Nazmi Faiz, Harimau Muda A, SC Beira Mar, PKNS F.C., Selangor FA
Ahmad Fakri Saarani, Perlis FA, Atlético S.C., Kelantan FA, Kedah FA

Retired
Serbegeth Singh, owner/founder of MyTeam, Blackburn Rovers F.C. (global advisor)
Mokhtar Dahari, former Selangor FA and Malaysian player
Lim Teong Kim, former Hertha BSC player
Matlan Marjan, former Sabah FA and Malaysian player
Soh Chin Aun, former Selangor FA and Malaysian player
Khairul Azman Mohamed, former Pahang FA, Sabah FA and Malaysian player

Racing
Nazim Azman
Nabil Jeffri
Weiron Tan
Aaron Lim
Tengku Djan Ley
Mohamed Fairuz Fauzy
Fariqe Hairuman
Nandakumar Puspanathan
Karamjit Singh
Alex Yoong, ex-Formula One and A1 Grand Prix
Alister Yoong
Shahrol Yuzy
Zulfahmi Khairuddin
Hafizh Syahrin
Jazeman Jaafar
Adam Norrodin
Khairul Idham Pawi
Zaqhwan Zaidi
Danial Syahmi
Izam Ikmal
Idil Fitri Mahadi
Kasma Daniel
Ibrahim Norrodin
Azroy Hakeem Anuar
Hakim Danish
Emil Idzhar
Farres Putra
Farish Hafiy
Azlan Shah Kamaruzaman

Others
Pandelela Rinong (born 1993), platform diving
Jupha Somnet, (born 1993), track cyclist
Shah Firdaus Sahrom (born 1995), track cyclist
M. Magendran (born 1963), mountain climber, first Malaysian to conquer the summit of Mount Everest (1997)
Muhamad Zarif Syahiir Zolkepeli (born 1998), archer
Azizulhasni Awang (born 1988), track cyclist
Khir Akyazlan Azmi (born 1992) professional boxer
Imran Daniel Abdul Hazli (born 2005), professional tennis player

Writers

Miscellaneous
 Anwar Fazal, consumer, environmental activist, health advocate
 Irene Fernandez, prominent Malaysian human rights activist
 Lat, famous cartoonist
 Norman Musa (born 1974), chef/restaurateur
 Yong Mun Sen (1896–1962), pioneer artist, father of Malaysian paintings
 Ling Tan (born 1974), international fashion model
 Noor Hisham Abdullah, director general of health

 01